The 1935–36 season was Manchester United's 40th season in the Football League.

At the end of the season, United finished champions and were promoted back to the First Division after five years away.

Second Division

FA Cup

References

Manchester United F.C. seasons
Manchester United